Shayne Mitchell Whittington (born March 27, 1991) is an American-Macedonian professional basketball player who plays for Nagoya Diamond Dolphins of the B.League. He also represents North Macedonia in the international competitions. He played college basketball for Western Michigan University.

High school career
Whittington attended Lawrence High School in Lawrence, Michigan. As a junior, he averaged 11.3 points, 9.2 rebounds and 2.1 blocks per game, leading Lawrence to a 23–2 record and earning Detroit Free Press Class D Honorable Mention All-State honors.

As a senior, he averaged 17.2 points, 12.1 rebounds, 4.0 blocks, 3.0 steals and 2.0 assists per game as the Tigers went 24–2, a school record for wins. He was named Class D First Team All-State by Bankhoops.com, BCAM, Detroit News, Detroit Free Press and Associated Press.

College career
In his freshman season at Western Michigan, Whittington played sparingly for the Broncos. In 16 games, he averaged 1.4 points and 1.6 rebounds in 5.9 minutes per game.

In November 2010, Whittington elected to redshirt the 2010–11 season after finding himself behind freshman Matt Stainbrook and junior Caleb Dean in the team's rotation.

On November 12, 2011, Whittington played his first game since the 2009–10 season at South Dakota State, recording three points and two rebounds in 10 minutes of action. In his redshirted sophomore season, he played 32 games (7 starts), averaging 4.2 points and 4.0 rebounds in 14.1 minutes per game.

In his junior season, he was named to the 2013 All-MAC second team and led the conference with 12 double-doubles. In 35 games (all starts), he averaged 13.2 points, 8.8 rebounds, 1.1 assists and 1.7 blocks in 29.7 minutes per game.

In his senior season, he was named to the 2014 All-MAC first team after being named the MAC West Player of the Week four times. In 31 games (all starts), he averaged 16.1 points, 8.9 rebounds, 1.1 assists and 1.5 blocks in 31.8 minutes per game.

Professional career

Indiana Pacers (2014–2016)
Whittington went undrafted in the 2014 NBA draft. On July 2, 2014, he signed with the Indiana Pacers. On November 8, he made his NBA debut in a 97–90 loss to the Washington Wizards, recording two points, three rebounds and two assists in eight minutes off the bench. On January 28, 2015, he was assigned to the Fort Wayne Mad Ants of the NBA Development League. He was recalled by the Pacers two days later. On April 8, he was reassigned to the Mad Ants to help the team in their playoff run. He returned to the Pacers in late April following the Mad Ants' 2–0 D-League Finals series loss to the Santa Cruz Warriors.

On July 27, 2015, Whittington re-signed with the Pacers. During the 2015–16 season, he received multiple assignments to the Fort Wayne Mad Ants. That offseason, he was waived by the Pacers.

Obradoiro CAB (2016–2017)
Whittington signed with Río Natura Monbus Obradoiro of Spain's Liga ACB on August 7, 2016.

Zenit Saint Petersburg (2017–2018)
On July 21, 2017, Whittington signed with Russian club Zenit Saint Petersburg for the 2017–18 season.

MoraBanc Andorra (2018)
On July 26, 2018, Whittington signed a two-year deal with MoraBanc Andorra of the Liga ACB.

Movistar Estudiantes (2018–2019)
On December 27, 2018, Whittington signed with Movistar Estudiantes of the Liga ACB.

Coosur Real Betis (2019–2020)
On August 1, 2019, Whittington signed a two-year deal with Coosur Real Betis of the Liga ACB. He averaged 8 points and 4 rebounds per game. On June 9, 2020, Whittington parted ways with the team.

NBA career statistics

Regular season

|-
| style="text-align:left;"| 
| style="text-align:left;"| Indiana
| 20 || 0 || 5.4 || .452 || .167 || .783 || 1.5 || .3 || .3 || .1 || 2.9
|-
| style="text-align:left;"| 
| style="text-align:left;"| Indiana
| 7 || 0 || 5.9 || .455 || .000 || .500 || 1.7 || .4 || .1 || .1 || 1.6
|-
| align="center" colspan="2" | Career
| 27 || 0 || 5.5 || .453 || .125 || .760 || 1.5 || .3 || .2 || .1 || 2.5

Personal life
Whittington is the son of Scott Whittington and Carrie Rokos, and has one older brother, Spencer, a younger sister, Erika, and two younger brothers, Cody and Joey.

References

External links

NBA D-League profile
Western Michigan Broncos bio

1991 births
Living people
American expatriate basketball people in Russia
American expatriate basketball people in Spain
American men's basketball players
Basketball players from Michigan
BC Andorra players
Expatriate basketball people in Andorra
BC Zenit Saint Petersburg players
CB Estudiantes players
Centers (basketball)
Fort Wayne Mad Ants players
Indiana Pacers players
Liga ACB players
Obradoiro CAB players
People from Paw Paw, Michigan
Power forwards (basketball)
Real Betis Baloncesto players
SeaHorses Mikawa players
Undrafted National Basketball Association players
Western Michigan Broncos men's basketball players